Beatty is a village in the Canadian province of Saskatchewan within the Rural Municipality of Flett's Springs No. 429 and Census Division No. 15. The village is located approximately 13 km (8 mi) northwest of the City of Melfort. It is at the junction of Highway 3 and Highway 368. In 1925, Beatty was a Canadian National Railways (CNR) rail station on the Swan River - Prince Albert branch line. The area surrounding Beatty is predominantly farmland and the main source of employment is agriculture.

History 
Beatty was named in 1904, after (and by) Reginald Beatty, an employee of the Hudson's Bay Company and the first settler in the Melfort district. Beatty post office was established in 1908 in the federal electoral district of Rosthern. Beatty incorporated as a village on March 31, 1921.

A community center was built in 1978 through local fundraising. This is still open and serves as a venue for weddings and community events.

Demographics 

Sports
Like most small communities in Saskatchewan, sports centered around hockey.  In 1948 the Beatty Memorial Rink was built by a group of local volunteers.  After many years, this rink was condemned to be destroyed because of its structural integrity.  The town rallied again and built a new rink.  This rink served the town until 1993.

In 1985 the Beatty Barons Senior Men's hockey team won the provincial championships.  The town of Beatty fielded pre-novice and novice hockey teams until 1993.  The rink was also used for community skating and hosting hockey tournaments.

Due to a financial issue which came to a head in 1993, the rink was sold to the town of Rocanville. The town of Rocanville had the rink taken apart piece by piece and moved 423 km away.

Education
Children living in Beatty are sent by bus to school in Melfort. 

The early one room school house in town was Beatty School District #1766. This also hosted a second one-room school house for the higher grades including grade 12. This school was open from 1933-1967.

See also 
 List of communities in Saskatchewan
 List of villages in Saskatchewan

References

External links
 Post Offices and Postmasters - ArchiviaNet - Library and Archives Canada
 Prince Albert Gen Web Region
 Saskatchewan Country Elevator System Maps with Index Years:1924-25, 1947-48, 1950-51, 1952-53, 1984
 GeoNames Query
 Canadian Maps: January 1925 Waghorn's Guide. Post Offices in Man. Sask. Alta. and West Ontario.

Villages in Saskatchewan
Flett's Springs No. 429, Saskatchewan
Division No. 15, Saskatchewan